Kijevci is a village in the municipality of Sjenica, Serbia. According to the 2011 census, the village has a population of 225 inhabitants.

Population

References

Populated places in Zlatibor District